Communauté d'agglomération du Grand Verdun is the communauté d'agglomération, an intercommunal structure, centred on the town of Verdun. It is located in the Meuse department, in the Grand Est region, northeastern France. Created in 2015, its seat is in Verdun. Its area is 300.9 km2. Its population was 27,493 in 2019, of which 16,942 in Verdun proper.

Composition
The communauté d'agglomération consists of the following 25 communes:

Beaumont-en-Verdunois
Belleray
Belleville-sur-Meuse
Béthelainville
Béthincourt
Bezonvaux
Bras-sur-Meuse
Champneuville
Charny-sur-Meuse
Chattancourt
Cumières-le-Mort-Homme
Douaumont-Vaux
Fleury-devant-Douaumont
Fromeréville-les-Vallons
Haudainville
Haumont-près-Samogneux
Louvemont-Côte-du-Poivre
Marre
Montzéville
Ornes
Samogneux
Sivry-la-Perche
Thierville-sur-Meuse
Vacherauville
Verdun

References

Verdun
Verdun